The 2015–16 Professional Football League is the third highest division in Russian football. The Professional Football League is geographically divided into 5 zones.
The winners of each zone are automatically promoted into the National Football League. The bottom finishers of each zone lose professional status and are relegated into the Amateur Football League.

West

Teams and stadiums

Standings

Top scorers

Center

Teams and stadiums

Standings

Top scorers

South

Teams and stadiums

Standings

Top scorers

Ural-Povolzhye

Teams and stadiums

Standings

Top scorers

East

Teams and stadiums

Standings

Top scorers

References

2015-16
3
Rus